Gigasjapyx is a genus of diplurans in the family Japygidae.

Species
 Gigasjapyx termitophilous Chou, 1984

References

Diplura